The Free Design is a September 1999 EP by the group Stereolab which served as the lead single from their sixth full-length studio album, Cobra and Phases Group Play Voltage in the Milky Night.  All four of its tracks were later re-released on the Oscillons from the Anti-Sun compilation.

The 12" and CD formats were classed as a budget album for chart purposes, and peaked at #6 on the UK Budget Albums chart. The two-track 7" format appeared separately on the UK Singles chart at #157.

Track listing
 "The Free Design" – 3:46
 "Escape Pod (From the World of Medical Observations)" – 3:57
 "With Friends Like These" – 5:49
 "Les Aimies des Memes" – 3:54

References

1999 EPs
Stereolab EPs